Kylix impressa is a species of sea snail, a marine gastropod mollusk in the family Drilliidae.

Description
The shell grows to a length of 14 mm. The shell is tuberculately ribbed with oblique ribs. The interstices are transversely striated The back of the body whorl is smooth. The shell has a pale flesh-color, the ribs are whitish. The outer lip is a little expanded.

Distribution
This species occurs in the demersal zone of the Pacific Ocean from Nicaragua to Costa Rica.

References

  Tucker, J.K. 2004 Catalog of recent and fossil turrids (Mollusca: Gastropoda). Zootaxa 682:1–1295

External links
 

impressa
Gastropods described in 1843